The Hardy Toll Road is a toll road in the Greater Houston area of the U.S. state of Texas, maintained by the Harris County Toll Road Authority. The route runs from Interstate 610 near central Houston to Interstate 45 just south of the Harris–Montgomery county line. The road generally parallels Interstate 45. The portion from I-610 to Crosstimbers Road was designated on September 26, 1984 as Spur 548, although this is unsigned.

Construction on the toll road started in September 1984 and the entire road was complete by June 1988. The toll road runs   and costs $3 to drive its full length ($1.50 north of Beltway 8 and $1.50 south of Beltway 8).  A four-mile (6 km) connecting road to the George Bush Intercontinental Airport requires a $1.20 toll.  As of July 18, 2016, the Hardy Toll Road discontinued cash tolling and made the switch to all-electronic tolling.  All drivers must now use an EZ TAG to access the toll road.

The road is named for nearby Hardy Street, which makes up the frontage roads for the toll road in two locations: between Spring Railroad Yard and FM 1960, and between Greens Road and Crosstimbers Road.

A large portion of the southern segment resembles Austin's Mopac Expressway in that an active line of the Union Pacific railroad runs along its median.

Planned extensions

Southward
In November 2007 the city of Houston gave approval for street closures required to construct the connections to the downtown freeway loop. Originally, construction was scheduled to start in August 2009 with completion sometime in 2011; however, this has been delayed. It is expected that the toll road will deviate from Hardy Street south of I-610 and follow Maury Street  to connect with the Eastex Freeway near I-10, as part of the ramp connections have already been built.

Construction on the Hardy Toll Road Downtown connector began in 2014.

Northward
As the population of Montgomery County has grown quickly in recent years, the need for a northward extension is being evaluated.  Originally, the plan was to construct the extension along the right of way for the railroad.  However, recent growth in Oak Ridge North will require that the Hardy Toll Road extension deviate from this right of way in places.  Feasibility studies have evaluated possible routes between FM 1314 and the San Jacinto River, with the northern terminus planned to be at Loop 336.  No plans for construction have yet been formulated.

Lane count
The following are the number of mainlanes in each direction, as of May 2017:
4 lanes each way between Interstate 610 and Crosstimbers Road (these lanes are the unsigned Spur 548)
3 lanes each way between Crosstimbers Road and Grand Parkway (SH 99 Toll)
2 lanes each way between Grand Parkway and Interstate 45 (northern terminus)

Exit list

Airport Connector

See also

References

External links

Freeways in Houston
Transportation in Harris County, Texas
Toll roads in Texas
County roads in Harris County, Texas